3822 Segovia is a stony Flora asteroid from the inner regions of the asteroid belt. It was discovered by Japanese astronomer Tsutomu Seki at Geisei Observatory in Kōchi, Japan, on 21 February 1988. It was later named after Spanish guitarist Andrés Segovia.

Orbit and classification 

The S-type asteroid is a member of the Flora family, one of the largest groups of stony asteroids in the main-belt. It orbits the Sun in the inner main-belt at a distance of 2.0–2.5 AU once every 3 years and 5 months (1,249 days). Its orbit has an eccentricity of 0.12 and an inclination of 3° with respect to the ecliptic.

Naming 

This minor planet was named for world-famous virtuoso classical guitarist Andrés Segovia (1893–1987). In 1959, the discoverer attended one of his concerts in Japan and became inspired to play the guitar. The  was published by the Minor Planet Center on 21 April 1989.

Physical characteristics 

In March 2016, a rotation period of Segovia was published using data from the Lowell Photometric Database (LPD). Using lightcurve inversion and convex shape models, as well as distributed computing power and the help of individual volunteers, a period of  hours could be obtained for this asteroid from the LPD's sparse-in-time photometry data. The Collaborative Asteroid Lightcurve Link assumes an albedo of 0.24 – derived from 8 Flora, the largest member and namesake of this orbital family – and calculates a diameter of 4.9 kilometers with an absolute magnitude of 13.7.

References

External links 
 Lightcurve Database Query (LCDB), at www.minorplanet.info
 Dictionary of Minor Planet Names, Google books
 Asteroids and comets rotation curves, CdR – Geneva Observatory, Raoul Behrend
 Discovery Circumstances: Numbered Minor Planets (1)-(5000) – Minor Planet Center
 
 

003822
Discoveries by Tsutomu Seki
Named minor planets
19880221